Blinder or Blinders may refer to:

Blinder (surname)
Blinders, also known as blinkers, a part of some types of equine bridle that blocks a horse's vision to the side and rear.
Blinders (poultry), a similar device that blocks forward vision for chickens
Blinder (film), a 2013 Australian film
The NATO reporting name for the Tupolev Tu-22 bomber
The term "navigational blinders" refers to the United States Army Corps of Engineers policy which prohibited the Corps from considering environmental, health and safety, or any other features when deciding on whether to issue a permit, subject to the Rivers and Harbors Act, Sections 9 and 10.

See also
Window blind
Beyer Blinder Belle, architectural firm